James Joseph Mill (19 November 1899 – 29 March 1950) was a New Zealand rugby union player. A halfback, Mill represented East Coast, Hawke's Bay and Wairarapa at a provincial level, and was a member of the New Zealand national side, the All Blacks, from 1923 to 1930. He played 33 matches for the All Blacks including four internationals. Of Ngāti Porou descent, Mill played for New Zealand Māori in 1922 and 1923.

References

1899 births
1950 deaths
Ngāti Porou people
People educated at Napier Boys' High School
People educated at Nelson College
New Zealand rugby union players
New Zealand international rugby union players
New Zealand farmers
Hawke's Bay rugby union players
Wairarapa rugby union players
Rugby union scrum-halves
Māori All Blacks players
Rugby union players from the Gisborne Region